Chilean Americans (chileno-estadounidenses,  or ) are Americans who have full or partial origin from Chile.

The Chilean population from the U.S. census was 126,810. In the United States, Chileans are the fourth smallest Latino group from South America and the fifth smallest overall amongst all Latino groups. Chilean Americans live mainly in the New York Metropolitan Area, South Florida, Los Angeles County, San Francisco Bay Area (esp. San Mateo County) and the Baltimore-Washington Metropolitan Area, with high population concentrations found in Queens in New York City; Northern New Jersey; Miami, Florida; and Nassau County, New York. Most Chileans migrating to the United States settle in metropolitan areas. After the 1960s, Chileans began to immigrate more for economic or academic rather than political reasons and that continues into the modern day.

History 

Chileans and other South Americans have been present in the state of California since the 1850s gold rush. Not all Chileans made it to the gold fields. Some remained in San Francisco, San Jose, Sacramento, and Stockton where they frequently worked as bricklayers, bakers, or seamen. Some with capital established themselves in various businesses, particularly the importation of flour and mining equipment from Chile. In the cities most tended to congregate and live in specific areas in the poorer sections of town. In the gold fields they lived in separate camp sites. In the summer of 1849 Chileans constituted the majority of the population of Sonora. Chileans frequently worked their mines as group efforts. When the placer gold ran out around Sonora the Chileans were amongst the first miners in California to extract gold from quartz. Historical remnants of those settlements influenced the names of locations such as Chileno Valley in Marin County, Chili Gulch in Calaveras and Chili Bar in Placer which was named after Chilean road builders. Names of Chilean towns and places are often found in the names of streets in Northern California: Valparaiso, Santiago, and Calera.

After Allende was overthrown and a military regime was established in 1973, a large exodus of Chileans took place. Most fled to European countries, but a small group did emigrate to the United States. The U.S. government took these Chileans as refugees under a program for "political parolees."

Many of San Francisco's streets carry names of former residents of Chile: Atherton, Ellis, Lick, Larkin, and others. Chilean women also left their names: Mina and Clementina. Manuel Briseño, an early journalist in the mines was one of the founders of the San Diego Union. Juan Evangelista Reyes was a Sacramento pioneer as were the Luco brothers. Luis Felipe Ramírez was one of the City Fathers in Marysville. The Leiva family owned at one time, much of the land in Marin County, including Fort Ross. In 1975, Chilean exiles of the Augusto Pinochet dictatorship established La Peña Cultural Center in Berkeley, California, which is to this day the largest Chilean cultural center in the United States.

Chilean Americans have achieved many skills as entrepreneurs, judges, musicians, and others.

As of 2020, no Chilean American has yet been elected to the United States Congress.

Motives of immigration

Most Chilean immigration to the U.S. has occurred largely since the 1990s. For the most part, Chileans left as either political asylees and refugees first during the presidency of the Marxist Salvador Allende or for economic reasons; the involvement of the United States in Salvador Allende's overthrow in 1973 and supporting the dictatorship of Augusto Pinochet, led to more political exiles fleeing from Chile to the U.S., as well as other countries.

Also, there have been others that have emigrated to seek higher education and career development opportunities. Since the 1960 Valdivia earthquake and with 2010 Chile earthquake, many Chileans have pursued economic opportunities in the United States, with Paterson, New Jersey, representing an increasingly common destination.

Many of the Pinochet-era immigrants were of middle or upper class origin. A significant proportion of them arrived with advanced educations and well-developed skills. They had contacts with other Chilean exiles and a sense of identity from their shared commitment to a democratic Chile. After a period of adjustment, many of them were able to pursue skilled jobs or professions. Unfortunately, others, who lacked skills or whose professional certifications were not recognized in the United States, were forced to take low-level jobs in which they were unable to use their skills. Some had been politically active students or union leaders in Chile who did not enter the United States with easily transferable skills.

The second major arrival into the United States was mainly for economic or academic opportunities. Yet, in general, acquiring a U.S. Visa requires the applicant to have a stable economic background, so most Chileans emigrating to the United States since 1990 have done so mostly for study purposes or to further their academic backgrounds.

Identity 
Chileans are mostly diverse, their ancestry can be fully West/South European as well as mixed with Indigenous and other European heritage. They commonly identify themselves as both Latino and white. Some Chilean-owned stores and restaurants advertise as French and Italian. Many often prefer living in white suburban neighborhoods in the U.S., and have a strong sense of family.

Demographics

Population by state

The 10 U.S. states with the largest population of Chilean Americans are:
 California – 24,006
 Florida – 23,549
 New York – 15,050
 New Jersey – 8,100
 Texas – 6,282
 Virginia – 4,195
 Maryland – 4,146
 Utah – 3,364
 Massachusetts – 3,045
 Illinois – 2,753

Population by urban agglomeration

The largest populations of Chilean Americans are situated in the following urban areas:
 New York-Northern New Jersey-Long Island, NY-NJ-PA MSA – 20,688
 Miami-Fort Lauderdale-Pompano Beach, FL MSA – 17,161
 Los Angeles-Long Beach-Santa Ana, CA MSA – 10,471
 Washington-Arlington-Alexandria, DC-VA-MD-WV MSA – 6,963
 San Francisco-Oakland-Fremont, CA MSA – 4,000
 Boston-Cambridge-Quincy, MA-NH MSA – 2,622
 Houston-Sugar Land-Baytown, TX MSA – 2,570
 Chicago-Joliet-Naperville, IL-IN-WI MSA – 2,454
 Riverside-San Bernardino-Ontario, CA MSA – 2,066
 Orlando-Kissimmee-Sanford, FL MSA – 1,884
 Atlanta-Sandy Springs-Marietta, GA MSA – 1,779
 Seattle-Tacoma-Bellevue, WA MSA – 1,776
 San Diego-Carlsbad-San Marcos, CA MSA – 1,730
 Dallas-Fort Worth-Arlington, TX MSA – 1,686
 Philadelphia-Camden-Wilmington, PA-NJ-DE-MD MSA – 1,505
 Salt Lake City, UT MSA – 1,463
 San Jose-Sunnyvale-Santa Clara, CA MSA – 1,397
 Las Vegas-Paradise, NV MSA – 1,376
 Tampa-St. Petersburg-Clearwater, FL MSA – 1,215
 Phoenix-Mesa-Glendale, AZ MSA – 1,211

Population by city proper

 New York City, New York – 7,026
 Los Angeles, California – 4,112
 Miami, Florida – 1,427
 Houston, Texas – 934
 San Diego, California and Chicago, Illinois – 876
 San Francisco, California – 754
 Miami Beach, Florida – 739
 Washington, DC – 697
 San Jose, California – 632
 Doral, Florida – 622
 Kendall, Florida – 613
 Hialeah, Florida – 602
 The Hammocks, Florida – 564
 Pembroke Pines, Florida – 558
 Fontainebleau, Florida – 549
 Hollywood, Florida – 542
 Kendale Lakes, Florida – 469
 Las Vegas, Nevada – 467
 Boston, Massachusetts – 405
 San Antonio, Texas – 374
 Union City, New Jersey – 372
 Charlotte, North Carolina – 368
 Philadelphia, Pennsylvania – 357
 Coral Springs, Florida – 342
 Miramar, Florida and Austin, Texas – 340

Population by percentage

U.S. communities with the highest percentages of Chileans as a percent of total population: (Source: Census 2010)
 Brookeville, Maryland – 3.73%
 Manorhaven, New York – 3.57%
 Oyster Bay, New York – 2.67%
 Warm Springs, Virginia – 1.63%
 Dover, New Jersey – 1.55%
 Key Biscayne, Florida – 1.50%
 Sleepy Hollow, New York – 1.48%
 Forest Home, New York – 1.40%
 Doral, Florida – 1.36%
 Victory Gardens, New Jersey – 1.32%
 Wharton, New Jersey – 1.27%
 The Crossings, Florida – 1.18%
 The Hammocks, Florida – 1.11%
 Inwood, New York – 1.10%
 North Lynbrook, New York – 1.01%

Chileans are more than 1% of the entire population in only fifteen communities in the United States.  These communities are mostly located in Miami-Dade County, Morris County, NJ, and Nassau County, NY.

Traditions and Customs 

Most Chileans have customs that blend well into the American lifestyle. The Chilean workday is similar to the American workday, with the regular businessperson working 45 hours a week from 8:30 am to 6:30 pm with a lunch break, as well as possibly staying behind at work for a few hours to work overtime. However, many Chileans outside Santiago are used to going home for lunch, something not as common in the U.S. and with Chilean Americans.

Unlike the "normal" American diet, Chileans are used to having four meals a day. Breakfast, lunch, tea (or onces) at about five o'clock, and a late dinner. Many people actually have onces during the early evening hours and skip dinner. Surprisingly, Chile is one of the only Latin countries where tea is a more popular drink than coffee, differing from American consumption trends as well.

Notable people

Alexa Guarachi – Tennis player
Los Abandoned – Chilean American rock band
Marjorie Agosín – Poet, essayist, fiction writer, activist, and professor.
Fernando Alegria – Stanford professor
Marsia Alexander-Clarke – American video installation artist
Isabel Allende – Chilean writer
Fernando Alvarez – Jockey
 Cayetano Apablasa (1847–1889) – Land owner and politician in Los Angeles, California. He was son of a Chilean.
Tom Araya – Musician
Claudio Arrau – Pianist
Felipe Bazar – U.S. Navy hero
Natascha Bessez – Singer and beauty pageant
Nico Bodonczy – Soccer player
Daniel Borzutzky – Poet and translator
Charissa Chamorro – Actress
Charmaine – Musician
Beto Cuevas – Singer
Angélica Castro – Former model, actress and TV presenter (see Wikipedia en español)
Cristian de la Fuente – Soap opera actor 
Patricia Demick – Boxer
Ruperto Donoso – Jockey
Ariel Dorfman – Educator, activist, and author
Juan Downey – Artist
Frank J. Duarte – Laser physicist and author
Matias Duarte – Inventor
Sebastian Edwards – Academic and economist
Paloma Elsesser – Plus size fashion model
Julio M. Fernandez – Biologist
Pablo Francisco – Comedian
Alberto Fuguet – Writer and film director
Thelma Furness, Viscountess Furness – Mistress of King Edward VIII
Jorge Garcia – Actor
John Gavin – Actor
Alexa Guarachi – Tennis player
Lisa Guerrero – Sportscaster and actress
Tommy Guerrero – Skateboarder, company owner, and musician
Claudio Guzmán – Television director, producer, art director, and production designer.
Sophia Hayden – Architect and the first woman graduate of Massachusetts Institute of Technology
Fareed Haque – Fusion guitarist
Alfredo Jaar – Artist, architect, and filmmaker
Nicolas Jaar – Composer and recording artist
Alain Johannes – Musician
Paulina Kernberg – Child psychiatrist and professor
Mario Kreutzberger – aka Don Francisco, U.S. Latino TV host
Juan Pablo Letelier – Socialist member of the Chilean Senate, son of Orlando Letelier
Jason Liebrecht – Voice actor
Vicente Luque – MMA fighter
Antonio Macia – Screenwriter and actor
Paloma Mami – Singer
Benny Mardones – Singer
Roberto Matta – Surreal painter
Gordon Matta-Clark – Artist
Claudio Miranda – Novelist and filmmaker
Gabriela Mistral – Nobel laureate
Daniella Monet – Actress
Harry Hays Morgan Jr. – Diplomat, society figure, and actor
Mauro E. Mujica – Chairman and CEO of U.S. English
Gloria Naveillán – Member of the Chamber of Deputies of Chile, born in Chicago
Ricardo A. Olea – Engineer and scientist
America Olivo – Actress, singer, and model
Cote de Pablo – Actress, singer and musical theater actress
Frank Pando – Actor
Marko Zaror – Actor
Pedro Pascal – Actor
Nicole Polizzi – Reality TV personality
Promis – Singer-songwriter and composer
Jose Quiroga – Cardiologist
Horatio Sanz – Comedian, Saturday Night Live
Elizabeth Schall – Singer-songwriter and guitarist
Sebastian Soto – Soccer player
Tom Araya – Musician
Elizabeth Subercaseaux – Writer  
Mahani Teave – Classical pianist and conservationist, born in Hawaii to a Rapanui father and an American mother
Ryann Torrero – Soccer player and model
Steve Thurston – Journalist, entrepreneur, and co-founder, CEO and president of Integrity Ministries
Mercedes Valdivieso – Chilean writer and Rice University professor
Arturo Valenzuela – Professor
Francisca Valenzuela – Chilean poet, singer-songwriter, and pianist
Leonor Varela – Actress
Andres Velasco – Economist and professor
Alexander Witt – Director

Chileans abroad
Of the 857,781 Chilean expatriates around the globe, 13.3% (114,084) live in the United States, 50.1% reside in Argentina, 4.9% in Sweden, and around 2% each in Canada and Australia, with the remaining 18% being scattered in smaller numbers across the globe, particularly the countries of the European Union.

See also

Demographics of Chile
Latino conservatism in the United States
Chileans in the United Kingdom
Chilean Australian
List of Chileans
Chile–United States relations

Notes

References
 US Census Chilean Factpage
 Are We Really So Fearful? by Ariel Dorfman The Washington Post 10/24/06

Further reading
 Burson, Phyllis J. "Chilean Americans." Gale Encyclopedia of Multicultural America, edited by Thomas Riggs, (3rd ed., vol. 1, Gale, 2014), pp. 479–490. online
 Pike, F. B. Chile and the United States: 1880–1962 (University of Notre Dame Press, 1963).
 Gomez, L.A. (2018). "Chilean Americans: A micro cultural Latinx group." In Patricia Arredondo (Ed.), Latinx immigrants: Transcending  acculturation and xenophobia (pp. 33-52). Springer.

External links
 Historical Text Archive History of Chileans and the California Gold Rush
 Rosales and the Chilean miners in California PBS American Experience the Gold Rush
 
 Cámara Chileno Norteamericana de Comercio (AMCHAM) Chilean American Chamber of Commerce
 
 The Avalon Project (Yale Law School) Chilean Diplomacy
 La Peña Cultural Center a major Chilean community and political activism center in Berkeley, California

 
Hispanic and Latino American

American